Adam Cristman (born January 8, 1985) is an American retired soccer player.

Career

Youth and college
Cristman graduated from Mills Godwin High School in Richmond, Virginia, where as a senior in 2003 he helped seal a perfect 22–0–0 record for the team on way to an AAA state championship and No. 1 national ranking. He played college soccer at the University of Virginia, where he scored 34 career goals and accumulated 15 assists. During his college years Cristman also played for the Richmond Strikers and Richmond Kickers Future in the USL Premier Development League.

Professional
Cristman was selected in the fourth round of the 2007 MLS SuperDraft by New England Revolution and signed a developmental contract with the club. He began his debut season as a starter with Pat Noonan out with injury, and later settled into a role as a regular sub and spot starter, appearing in almost every game of the season. His solid play quickly earned him a bump up to the senior roster in midseason.

After the 2008 season, Cristman was traded to Kansas City Wizards for allocation money and a third round 2009 MLS SuperDraft selection. On July 25, 2009, after being plagued by injury for the first few months of the year, he made his debut coming on as a second-half sub in an MLS game against LA Galaxy.

In February 2010, D.C. United acquired Cristman from Kansas City in exchange for use of an international roster slot through December 31, 2011.

On January 11, 2011 Cristman was traded to Los Angeles Galaxy in exchange for the Galaxy's first-round pick in the 2011 MLS Supplemental Draft. After an extended layoff while he recovered from a knee injury, Cristman made his Galaxy debut on June 3, 2011, as a late substitute in a 0–0 tie with D.C. United.

He signed a new contract with Los Angeles on December 23, 2011.

On July 3, 2012, Cristman retired from professional soccer due to injuries (multiple concussions).

International
Cristman has played for the US national U-18 and U-23 teams.

Honors

New England Revolution
Lamar Hunt U.S. Open Cup (1): 2007
North American SuperLiga (1): 2008

Los Angeles Galaxy
MLS Cup (1): 2011
Major League Soccer Supporters' Shield (1): 2011
Major League Soccer Western Conference Championship (1): 2011

References

External links
 

1985 births
Living people
American soccer players
Virginia Cavaliers men's soccer players
Richmond Kickers Future players
New England Revolution players
Sporting Kansas City players
D.C. United players
LA Galaxy players
Soccer players from Virginia
Soccer players from Washington, D.C.
USL League Two players
Major League Soccer players
New England Revolution draft picks
United States men's youth international soccer players
United States men's under-23 international soccer players
Association football forwards